The following is a list of accredited colleges and universities in the U.S. state of Utah.

Public institutions

All public institutions in the state of Utah are managed by the Utah System of Higher Education, which consists of eight public colleges and universities and eight technical colleges.

Four-year institutions

Two-year institutions

Associate's colleges
Salt Lake Community College, various locations in Salt Lake County
Snow College, Ephraim and Richfield

Technical colleges
 Bridgerland Technical College, Logan 
 Davis Technical College, Kaysville
 Dixie Technical College, St. George
 Mountainland Technical College, Orem
 Ogden–Weber Technical College, Ogden
 Southwest Technical College, Cedar City
 Tooele Technical College, Tooele
 Uintah Basin Technical College, Roosevelt

Private institutions

Four-year institutions

Defunct institutions

See also

Utah System of Higher Education
Utah College of Applied Technology
Higher education in the United States
 List of college athletic programs in Utah
List of American institutions of higher education
List of recognized higher education accreditation organizations
List of colleges and universities
List of colleges and universities by country

References

External links
Department of Education listing of accredited institutions in Utah

Utah, List of colleges and universities in
Colleges and universities in Utah, List of